Lampi is a municipality on Crete, Greece.

Lampi may also refer to:

 Lampi (surname)
 Lampius, a 4th-century bishop of Barcelona
 Lanbi Kyun, also known as Lampi Island, Mergui Archipelago, Myanmar
 Lampi Island Marine National Park, Myanmar
 Lampi Kyun Wildlife Reserve, Myanmar
 Langpih, also spelled Lampi or Lumpi, a village in northeast India